The 2023 Women's Challenge Cup (known for sponsorship reasons as the 2023 Betfred Women's Challenge Cup) will be the 11th staging of the Rugby Football League's cup competition for women's rugby league clubs.

Format
The competition uses the same format used in 2022 with four groups of four compete in a single round robin with group winners and runners-up advancing to the knockout rounds. The group stage draw took place on 12 January.

Group stage
The fixture list for the group stage was published on 16 February 2023.

Final

On 12 August 2022, the RFL announced that the Women's Challenge Cup Final would make its Wembley debut, and be played as a double header with the men's final. The final will be played on 12 August 2023.

See also
2023 Challenge Cup

References

Challenge Cup
Challenge Cup
RFL Women's Challenge Cup
rugby league